Rowan Carroll (born 3 November 1970) is a British rower. She competed in the women's eight event at the 2000 Summer Olympics. She was part of the quadruple sculls with Trisha Corless, Tonia Williams and Lucy Hart that won the national title rowing for the NCRA at the 1995 National Championships, she also gained a silver in the single sculls behind Tish Reid.

References

External links
 

1970 births
Living people
British female rowers
Olympic rowers of Great Britain
Rowers at the 2000 Summer Olympics
Rowers from Greater London